Alaina Denise Coates (born April 7, 1995) is an American professional basketball player who recently played for the Indiana Fever of the Women’s National Basketball Association (WNBA) and Galatasaray in Turkey. She played college basketball for the University of South Carolina.

High School career
Coates enjoyed a stellar high school career. She was both a McDonald's and Parade All-American.
She was chosen as the 2013 Gatorade South Carolina Player of the Year, South Carolina Basketball Coaches Association (SCBCA) Class 4A Player of the Year, Charlotte Observer South Carolina Miss Basketball, and became a three-time SCBCA Class 4A all-state selection.

During her senior season, she posted 20.1 points, 11.6 rebounds and 3.6 blocks per game while leading her team to back-to-back state championships (including an undefeated 29-0 season in 2012-2013.)

College career
Heavily recruited by power programs, she was ranked the 28th overall player as part of a high-profile 2013 recruiting class. After receiving offers from Tennessee, and Georgia, she eventually chose South Carolina to play for her hometown team. She went on to become a 4x All-SEC player, and All-American. Coates played a crucial part in helping South Carolina become a national powerhouse. In her senior season, Coates injured her ankle, which caused her to miss South Carolina's SEC Tourney & National Championship run. Coates finished the season averaging 13.4 ppg and 11.1 rpg.

Professional career

WNBA
After her senior season, Coates was drafted second overall by the Chicago Sky in the 2017 WNBA draft. In April 2017, it was announced that Coates would miss part of the 2017 WNBA season following ankle surgery. However, a timetable for her return still wasn't determined and Coates would end up missing the entire season. In February 2018, Coates officially signed with the Sky. She made her career debut on May 19, 2018, in the Sky's season opener against the Indiana Fever, she scored 5 points in 12 minutes of play in an 82-64 victory. On July 3, 2018, Coates scored in double digits for the first time with 10 points in 16 minutes of play during a 108-85 loss to the Dallas Wings. By the end of the season, the Sky finished 13-21, missing out on the playoffs.

On May 21, 2019, Coates was traded to the Minnesota Lynx in exchange for a 2020 third-round draft pick.
On July 14, 2019, Coates was waived by the Minnesota Lynx, then on July 17, 2019, signed by the Atlanta Dream. Coates signed with the Washington Mystics on June 29, 2020, and made her debut for the team on the opening day of the season.

Overseas
In October 2018, Coates signed with Zhejiang Far East of the Chinese League for the 2018-19 off-season.

On 5 October 2022, she signed with Galatasaray of the Turkish Women's Basketball Super League (TKBL).

Personal life
Alaina is the daughter of Gary and Pamela Coates. She has an older brother, Gary. Her uncle, Ben Coates, is retired from the NFL and was a member of the Baltimore Ravens first Super Bowl. While at South Carolina, she majored in sociology. In March 2018, Coates's father died of cardiac arrest.

Career statistics

College 

Source

WNBA

Regular season

|-
| style='text-align:left;'|2018
| style='text-align:left;'|Chicago
| 32 || 0 || 11.4 || .568 || .000 || .625 || 3.2 || 0.4 || 0.2 || 0.2 || 0.5 || 3.4
|-
| style='text-align:left;'|2019
| style='text-align:left;'|Minnesota
| 14 || 0 || 6.6 || .484 || .000 || .625 || 2.4 || 0.1 || 0.2 || 0.4 || 0.4 || 2.5
|-
| style='text-align:left;'|2019
| style='text-align:left;'|Atlanta
| 9 || 0 || 8.3 || .643 || .000 || .538 || 3.0 || 0.1 || 0.2 || 0.7 || 0.4 || 2.8
|-
| style='text-align:left;'|2020
| style='text-align:left;'|Washington
| 20 || 0 || 9.9 || .529 || .000 || .538 || 2.8 || 0.5 || 0.4 || 0.2 || 0.6 || 2.5
|-
| style='text-align:left;'|2022
| style='text-align:left;'|Indiana
| 8 || 0 || 9.4 || .636 || .000 || .933 || 2.0 || 0.3 || 0.3 || 0.4 || 0.6 || 3.5
|-
| style='text-align:left;'| Career
| style='text-align:left;'| 4 years, 5 teams
| 83 || 0 || 9.7 || .555 || .000 || .637 || 2.8 || 0.3 || 0.2 || 0.3 || 0.5 || 3.0

Postseason

|-
| style='text-align:left;'|2020
| style='text-align:left;'|Washington
| 1 || 0 || 4.0 || .000 || .000 || .000 || 1.0 || 0.0 || 0.0 || 0.0 || 0.0 || 0.0 
|-
| style='text-align:left;'| Career
| style='text-align:left;'| 1 year, 1 team
| 1 || 0 || 4.0 || .000 || .000 || .000 || 1.0 || 0.0 || 0.0 || 0.0 || 0.0 || 0.0

References

External links

USA Basketball bio

1995 births
Living people
American expatriate basketball people in China
American women's basketball players
Atlanta Dream players
Basketball players at the 2015 Pan American Games
Basketball players from South Carolina
Centers (basketball)
Chicago Sky draft picks
Chicago Sky players
Indiana Fever players
McDonald's High School All-Americans
Minnesota Lynx players
Pan American Games medalists in basketball
Pan American Games silver medalists for the United States
Parade High School All-Americans (girls' basketball)
People from Irmo, South Carolina
South Carolina Gamecocks women's basketball players
Washington Mystics players
Medalists at the 2015 Pan American Games
21st-century American women
Nesibe Aydın GSK players
Galatasaray S.K. (women's basketball) players